Local elections to Northumberland County Council, a county council in the north east of England, were held on 5 May 2005, resulting in a council with Labour members forming a majority.

Results

References

External links
Northumberland County Council

2005
2005 English local elections
21st century in Northumberland